Alessandro Gallo (died 4 March 1645) was a Roman Catholic prelate who served as Bishop of Massa Lubrense (1632–1645).

Biography
On 24 November 1632, Alessandro Gallo was appointed by Pope Urban VIII as Bishop of Massa Lubrense.
On 8 December 1632, he was consecrated bishop by Giovanni Battista Pamphili, Cardinal-Priest of Sant’Eusebio with Tommaso Cellesi, Archbishop of Dubrovnik, and Celso Zani, Bishop of Città della Pieve, as co-consecrators. 
He served as Bishop of Massa Lubrense until his death on 4 March 1645.

While bishop, he was the principal co-consecrator of Girolamo Martini, Bishop of Ugento (1637).

References

External links and additional sources
 (for Chronology of Bishops) 
 (for Chronology of Bishops) 

1645 deaths
17th-century Italian Roman Catholic bishops
Bishops appointed by Pope Urban VIII